Schachner is a German surname. Notable people with the surname include:

 Bernhard Schachner (born 1986), Austrian footballer
 Franz Schachner (born 1950), Austrian luger
 Judith Byron Schachner (born 1951), American children's book writer and illustrator
 Max Schachner (1914–1944), German SS officer
 Nat Schachner (1895–1955), American writer
 Sarah Schachner (born 1957), American composer
 Walter Schachner (born 1957), Austrian footballer and manager

See also
Schechner

German-language surnames